Tazeh Kand-e Shahverdi (also Romanized as Tāzeh Kand-e Shāhverdī; also known as Tāzehkand-e Qeshlāq, Tāzeh Kand, and Tāzehkand) is a village in Qeshlaq Rural District of Fandoqlu District of Ahar County, East Azerbaijan province, Iran. At the 2006 National Census, its population was 137 in 32 households. The following census in 2011 counted 183 people in 48 households. The latest census in 2016 showed a population of 134 people in 43 households; it was the center of Fandoqlu District.

References 

Ahar County

Populated places in East Azerbaijan Province

Populated places in Ahar County